Atiq Mosque is located in Ghadames, Libya. Originally constructed in 1258, it is one of the main and largest mosque of the old town of Ghadames.

History 
Ghadames has over 20 mosques among its six neighborhoods in the old town. One of the biggest mosques is Atiq mosque (عتیق مسجد) , which is made of mud brick and has minimal ornamentation. In the beginning, it was built in 1258/666 AH.

A historical mosque called the Atiq Mosque in Ghadamès, also known as the Old Mosque of Ghadamès, is situated in the historic city of Ghadames in the Nalut Region of northwest Libya. The mosque's earliest recorded history dates to the time of the Islamic conquests in the seventh century AD, after which it underwent restoration and expansion. After being completely destroyed during World War II, the mosque was reconstructed while retaining its distinctive architectural design. The Atiq Mosque, which is a part of Old Town of Ghadames, was included as a UNESCO World Heritage Site in 1986.

References

Ghadames
Mosques in Libya